Yoiking with the Winged Ones is a polyphonic sound project by Ánde Somby. In the recording, Somby performs yoiking, the ancient chanting practise of the Sámi People of northern Europe, in concert with the sounds of nature. The album edition of the project was released by Ash International as a vinyl record in January 2016. Yoiking with the Winged Ones is also presented as an art installation. Røst Air and Ny Musikk in collaboration with Tromsø Kunstforening had a show from 22 May to 4 June 2017.

The project is performed and produced by Ánde Somby, an artist deeply rooted in the yoik tradition. In this project, Somby contributes to the tradition of yoik with a pretty expressive style of yoiking.

The title references to 3 inspirations. The first is the traditional story that the underground fairies (gufihttarat) were the ones that taught the Sámi people to yoik. The second inspiration is the Norwegian song Nisser og Dverge.  That song is according to Somby the start of Norway's war against their own fairies and elf and thereby the earth that has a soul. The third inspiration is the myth about Narcissus and Echo.

Reception
The LP Yoiking with the Winged Ones has been reviewed in Somby's native language Sámi  as well as in Danish and Norwegian. The album is reviewed also in Italian, German, French, Dutch, Japanese, and English.

According to PassiveAggressive, he is almost on the border of the human voice. Somby's yoiking has been described as having the energy that punk rock had before it was tamed in the music studios, with Klassekampen comparing Somby's work to that of the English punk band Cockney Rejects.

Track listing

In yoiks, there can sometimes be epic lyrics containing long narratives. Other times, there can be poetic texts. There can also be no lyrics at all. In this project, there are no lyrics.

Production

The recordings and post production were by Chris Watson, a sound artist and sound recordist from Newcastle upon Tyne. The sampling of sounds took place in Kvalnes, Lofoten in June 2014.

The artist A K Dolven, living in Kvalnes and London has been instrumental and important in developing the concept, and produced the album's cover art. The production was supported by the Sami Parliament of Norway.

References

External links 
 01/16/2016 NRK Jungeltelelegrafen https://radio.nrk.no/serie/jungeltelegrafen#t=32m5s
 01/14/2016 The Wire Adventures in sound and music http://www.thewire.co.uk/audio/on-air/adventures-in-sound-and-music-14-january-2016
 11/12/2015 Featured in Nordlys
 11/09/2015 The BBC's Late Junction played a track and mentioned the record.
 10/29/2015 Featured in NRK Sápmi
 10/27/2015 Featured in Avvir.no

2016 albums
Albums by Norwegian artists
Sámi music albums
Norwegian contemporary art